The survival film is a film genre in which one or more characters make an effort at physical survival. It often overlaps with other film genres. It is a subgenre of the adventure film, along with swashbuckler films, war films, and safari films. Survival films are darker than most other adventure films and usually focus their storyline on a single character, usually the protagonist. The films tend to be "located primarily in a contemporary context", so film audiences are familiar with the setting, and the characters' activities are less romanticized.

In a 1988 book, Thomas Sobchack compared the survival film to romance film: "They both emphasize the heroic triumph over obstacles which threaten social order and the reaffirmation of predominant social values such as fair play and respect for merit and cooperation." The author said survival films "identify and isolate a microcosm of society", such as the surviving group from the plane crash in The Flight of the Phoenix (1965) or those on the overturned ocean liner in The Poseidon Adventure (1972). Sobchack explained, "Most of the time in a survival film is spent depicting the process whereby the group, cut off from the securities and certainties of the ordinary support networks of civilized life, forms itself into a functioning, effective unit." The group often varies in types of characters, sometimes to the point of caricature. While women have historically been stereotyped in such films, they "often play a decisive role in the success or failure of the group."

List of films

See also 
 Battle royale genre
 List of apocalyptic films
 List of disaster films

References

Bibliography

Film genres